Furiiru may refer to:
Furiiru people
Furiiru language

Language and nationality disambiguation pages